Clément Chidekh (born 13 June 2001) is a French tennis player.

Chidekh has a career-high ATP singles ranking of 434 achieved on 6 February 2023. He also has a career-high ATP doubles ranking of 1013 achieved on 6 February 2023.

Chidekh made his ATP main draw debut at the 2023 Open Sud de France after qualifying for the singles main draw.

Chidekh played college tennis at the University of Washington.

References

External links

2001 births
Living people
French male tennis players
People from Arles
Washington Huskies men's tennis players